Scenes from the Life of the Virgin Mary (Italian - Le Storie della Vergine) is a cycle of frescos by Filippo Lippi in Spoleto Cathedral.

History
The cycle was commissioned in 1466, when Lippi had completed his Stories of St. Stephen and St. John the Baptist at Prato Cathedral, and was abruptly terminated by Lippi's death in 1469, caused by poison according to Vasari's Lives of the Artists. His studio assistants completed the work in around three months. Lippi was buried in Spoleto Cathedral despite Lorenzo the Magnificent's request for the remains to be returned to Florence - Spoleto replied that unlike Florence their great new cathedral had no illustrious men buried in it.

Scenes
From left to right the cycle shows:
 Annunciation
 Dormition (centre, out of chronological sequence, probably at the commissioner's request due to the cathedral's dedication to the Assumption)
 Nativity
 Coronation of the Virgin (high on the half-domed apse)

Gallery

References

Paintings by Filippo Lippi
Church frescos in Italy
Paintings in Umbria
Paintings of the Death of the Virgin
Paintings depicting the Annunciation
Paintings of the Coronation of the Virgin 
Nativity of Jesus in art
1460s paintings
Spoleto